Kim Eun-hee (born January 7, 1972) is a South Korean playwright and screenwriter. She has been working on the Netflix series Kingdom since 2011.

Career
On March 5, 2017, Kim was announced as the creator and screenwriter for the Netflix political period horror thriller series Kingdom. The series debuted on January 25, 2019, to critical acclaim. The series was renewed for a second season which was released on March 13, 2020. A special feature-length episode of the series, titled Kingdom: Ashin of the North was announced in November 2020. It was released on July 23, 2021, and focused on the supporting character Ashin played by Jun Ji-hyun.

Philanthropy 
On March 4, 2022, Kim donated 30 million won to the Children's Fund in Ukraine, along with her husband, Jang Hang-jun, to help Ukrainian victims in Russian invasion.

Personal life
Kim is married to director Jang Hang-jun.

Writings

Television series

Film

Webcomic
 The Kingdom of the Gods (with Yang Kyung-il)

Awards and nominations

State honor

Notes

References

Living people
People from Seoul
South Korean television writers
South Korean screenwriters
1972 births